Zephyr/Dillon Field Aerodrome  is located  west of Zephyr, Ontario, Canada.

References

Registered aerodromes in Ontario
Airports in the Regional Municipality of Durham